= Hobson Performance Center =

D. Rich Memorial
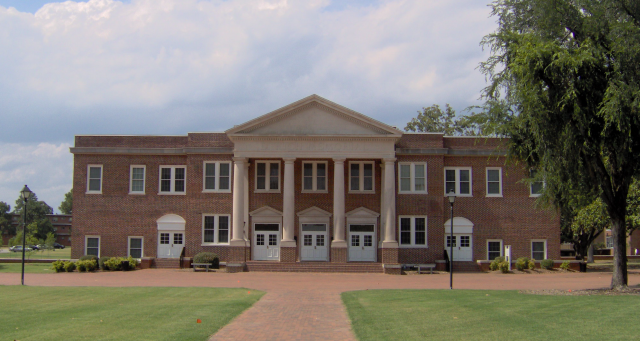
- D. Rich Memorial

General information
- Type: Educational
- Location: Buies Creek, North Carolina
- Completed: 1926
- Owner: Campbell University

The D. Rich Memorial building is the centerpiece educational building on the Buies Creek, North Carolina campus of Campbell University that was completed in 1926 after a donation from D. Rich. D. Rich’s memory and donation lives on through the building. His quote “Buies Creek must live on” is written on the back of the building. D. Rich Memorial anchors the Academic Circle portion of the main campus. Originally used as an administration building, the building is now home to administrative offices for the History, Political Science and Criminal Justice programs, as well as classroom spaces for various academic programs. It also houses Campbell's Hobson Performance Center, formerly, Turner Auditorium.

The Hobson Performance Center is located within the building. It has a 994 seat capacity and incorporates enhanced acoustics for choir and band performances.

== Name change to Hobson Performance Center ==
On January 9, 2020, Turner Auditorium, inside D. Rich Memorial, was changed to Hobson Performance Center after the recent donation by the Hobson family.
